Angelim (Angelinne) is a municipality/city in the state of Pernambuco in Brazil. The population in 2020, according to IBGE, was 11,226 inhabitants and the total area is 118.03 km2.

Geography
 State - Pernambuco
 Region - Agreste of Pernambuco
 Boundaries - Jupi (N); Palmeirina (S); Canhotinho (E); São João (W).
 Area - 118.03 km2
 Elevation - 631m
 Hydrography - Mundaú River
 Vegetation - Subcaducifólia forest
 Climate  -  Hot and humid
 Annual average temperature - 22.0 c
 Distance to Recife - 235 km

Economy
The main economic activities in Angelim are related with food & beverage industry, commerce and agribusiness, especially creations of cattle, chickens; and plantations of manioc and beans.

Economic indicators

Economy by Sector
2006

Health indicators

References

Municipalities in Pernambuco